The Bom, or Bawm, are an ethnic community inhabiting the Chittagong Hill Tracts of Bangladesh. The Bawm are one of smallest ethnic groups in Bangladesh. In 2004, around 10,000 Bawm inhabited India, with the population in all countries totalling around 24,500. In 2011, 12,000 Bawms inhabited the Chittagong Hills of Bangladesh, and 2,500 Bawm inhabited Myanmar. They speak the Sino-Tibetan Bawm language.

History
The Bawms of the Chittagong Hill Tracts in Bangladesh call their settlements “Bawmram” which means a Bawm inhabited area or region. To the Mizos of Mizoram and the Chins of Chin Hills, their settlements have also been known as “Bawmram”.  Many archeological relics, sanctuaries, ruined villages, imprints and reminiscent are found in the north-eastern side of the present Chittagong and Chittagong Hill Tracts. These are important indicators of the earliest Bawm settlement. The Bawms and other Kuki-Chin tribes are the first inhabitants in the Chittagong Hill Tracts. Most of the Bawm tribe were known as "Kuki" by the Bengalis. They are known also as Chin in Myanmar.

Religion
Owing to the efforts of Baptist Christian missionaries funded by the British government since 1918, the majority of the Bawm have adopted to Christianity, and it was said that all of them are Christians. They strongly believe in Christ. There are about 107 Pastors, 98 Evangelists and 321 elders among the Bawms serving in different Churches like Evangelical Christian Church (ECC), Presbyterian Church in Bangladesh (PCB), Bangladesh Christian Church (BCC), Evangelical Reformed Presbyterian Church (ERPC), Bangladesh Bawm Tribal Baptist Church (BBTBC), Independence Baptist Church Bangladesh (IBC - B), Bangladesh Baptist Church Sangha (BBCS), Church of Christ (COC) and Bangladesh Missionary Church (BMC) etc.

References

External links 
 
 Bawm Christianity
 Dance of the Bawn tribe in Ruma
 Ethnologue profile

Ethnic groups in Bangladesh
Kuki tribes